A job evaluation is a systematic way of determining the value/worth of a job in relation to other jobs in an organization. It tries to make a systematic comparison between jobs to assess their relative worth for the purpose of establishing a rational pay structure.
Job evaluation needs to be differentiated from job analysis. Job analysis is a systematic way of gathering information about a job. Every job evaluation method requires at least some basic job analysis in order to provide factual information about the jobs concerned. Thus, job evaluation begins with job analysis and ends at that point where the worth of a job is ascertained for achieving pay equity between jobs and different roles.

Process

Methods

Ranking, classification, and factor comparison (the point method) are three methods of job evaluation.

Market pricing

Market pricing is the process for determining the external value 
of jobs, allowing you to establish wage and salary structures and pay rates that are market 
sensitive. Job matching session is conducted.

Limitations
Job evaluation is not completely scientific.
Different job evaluators may reach different results, requiring validation
More complex systems, such as point factor, may be difficult to explain to managers or employees

References

 
Human resource management
Management theory

de:Stellenbewertung
es:Valoración de puestos